Allyn House may refer to:

Capt. Benjamin Allyn, II, House, Windsor, CT, listed on the NRHP in Connecticut
Deshon-Allyn House, New London, CT, listed on the NRHP in Connecticut
Allyn House (Arlington, Massachusetts), listed on the NRHP in Massachusetts
A. H. Allyn House,	Delavan, WI, listed on the NRHP in Wisconsin